Sanyam Lodha (born 20 January 1966) is a politician from Rajasthan. He was elected to the Rajasthan Vidhan Sabha from Sirohi as an independent candidate in the year 2018 Assembly Election. He is known to support Indian National Congress in the state. He was also an MLA from Sirohi VIdhan Sabha (Assembly) in the year 2003 and 2008. In the election of 2013 He lost the election to Otaram Dewasi.

Sanyam Lodha is a residence of Sheoganj, a town in Sirohi District Rajasthan.

Early life 
He commenced his political career in 1998 and since then he has been elected three times as an MLA. He is first generation politician and he worked his way through to becoming an MLA. He was a reporter in Rajasthan Patrika. He was also Joint Secretary of NSUI in 1987

Education 
He completed his B.Com. from Rajasthan University and then LLb from Jai Narayan Vyas University - Jodhpur. During his college time he became Joint Secretary in the year 1987. Which boosted his political ambition.

References 

Living people
Members of the Rajasthan Legislative Assembly
1966 births